The Minnesota Chippewa Tribe is the centralized governmental authority for six Ojibwe bands in Minnesota. The tribe was created on June 18, 1934; the organization and its governmental powers are divided between the tribe, and the individual bands, which directly operate their reservations. The bands that make up the tribe are:
Bois Forte Band of Chippewa
Fond du Lac Band of Lake Superior Chippewa
Grand Portage Band of Chippewa
Leech Lake Band of Ojibwe
Mille Lacs Band of Ojibwe
White Earth Band of Ojibwe

As of July 2003, the six bands have 40,677 enrolled members. The White Earth Band is the largest, which had more than 19,000 members. According to the 2010 US Census, the Leech Lake Band had 10,660 residents living on its reservation, the most of any single reservation in the state.

Notably, the Red Lake Band of Chippewa is not part of the Minnesota Chippewa Tribe. In 1934 it declined to participate, as its citizens did not want to give up the band's system of hereditary chiefs. The Red Lake Band developed its constitution in the 1950s, electing its first chairman in 1959. The Chippewa nation predates the European colonization of the Americas.

Services
The Minnesota Chippewa Tribe provides basic services to each of its six-member Bands, unless the individual Band has signed a compact to provide these services themselves.  The services are provided through their offices located in Cass Lake, Minnesota.

Administration
Executive Direction
Tribal Operations
Enrollment
Accounting & Liquor Licenses
Human Resources
Education
Scholarship Information
Johnson O’Malley
Indian Boarding Schools
Finance Corporation
Home Loans
Business Loans
Homes for Sale
Human Services
Senior Services
Investment, Employment and Welfare
Food Stamp Nutrition Education

External links
Minnesota Chippewa Tribe – Official website
Bois Forte Band of Chippewa
Fond du Lac Band of Lake Superior Chippewa
Grand Portage Band of Lake Superior Chippewa
Leech Lake Band of Ojibwe
Mille Lacs Band of Ojibwe
White Earth Indian Reservation Tribal Council

 
Ojibwe in Minnesota
Ojibwe governments
Native American tribes in Minnesota
Federally recognized tribes in the United States
Cass County, Minnesota